Tolonen is a Finnish surname. Notable people with the surname include:

 Jussi Tolonen (1882–1962), Finnish smallholder and politician
 Armas Tolonen (1893–1954), Finnish politician
 Jukka Tolonen (born 1952), Finnish jazz guitarist
 Maximo Tolonen (born 2001), Finnish professional footballer

Finnish-language surnames